The 2015 Finnish Cup (Suomen Cup) is the 61st season of the Finnish Cup. 132 clubs entered the competition, including all sides on the top two levels of the Finnish football pyramid (Veikkausliiga and Ykkönen), 19 sides from Kakkonen and 91 from lower levels. The winner of the cup enters the first qualifying round of the 2016–17 UEFA Europa League.

Teams

First round 
16 teams playing in the Kolmonen and lower leagues started the cup at the first round. The draw for the first and second rounds was held on 22 December 2014.

Second round

Third round

Fourth round

Fifth round

Sixth round

Quarter-finals

Semi-finals

Final

References 

2015
Finnish Cup
Cup